Mai Elisabeth Zetterling (24 May 1925 – 17 March 1994) was a Swedish film director, novelist and actress.

Early life
Zetterling was born in Västerås, Sweden to a working class family. She started her career as an actor at the age of 17 at Dramaten, the Swedish national theatre, appearing in war-era films.

Career
Zetterling appeared in film and television productions spanning six decades from the 1940s to the 1990s. Her breakthrough came in the 1944 film Torment written for her by Ingmar Bergman, in which she played a controversial role as a tormented shopgirl. Shortly afterwards she moved to England and gained instant success there with her title role in Basil Dearden's Frieda (1947) playing opposite David Farrar.

After a brief return to Sweden in which she worked with Bergman again in his film Music in Darkness (1948), she returned to Britain and starred in a number of UK films, playing against such leading men as Tyrone Power, Dirk Bogarde, Richard Widmark, Laurence Harvey, Peter Sellers, Herbert Lom, Richard Attenborough, Keenan Wynn, Stanley Baker and Dennis Price.

Some of her notable films as an actress include Quartet (1948), a film based on some of W. Somerset Maugham's short stories, The Romantic Age (1949) directed by Edmond T. Gréville, Only Two Can Play (1962) co-starring Peter Sellers and directed by Sidney Gilliat, and The Witches (1990), an adaptation of Roald Dahl's book directed by Nicolas Roeg. Having gained a reputation as a sex symbol in dramas and thrillers, she was equally effective in comedies, and was active in British television in the 1950s and 1960s.

She began directing and publishing novels and non-fiction in the early 1960s, her films starting with political documentaries and a short film titled The War Game (1963), which was nominated for a BAFTA award, and won a Silver Lion at Venice, both for the Best Short Film. Her first feature film Älskande par (1964, "Loving Couples"), based on the novels of Agnes von Krusenstjerna, was banned at the Cannes Film Festival for its sexual explicitness and nudity. Kenneth Tynan of The Observer later called it "one of the most ambitious debuts since Citizen Kane". It was not the only film she made that caused controversy for its frank sexuality.

When critics reviewing her debut feature stated that "Mai Zetterling directs like a man," she began to explore feminist themes more explicitly in her work. The Girls, which had an all-star Swedish cast that included Bibi Andersson and Harriet Andersson, discussed women's liberation (or lack thereof) in a society controlled by men, as the protagonists compare their lives to characters in the play Lysistrata, and find that things have not progressed very much for women since ancient times.

In 1966, she appeared as a storyteller on the BBC children's programme Jackanory, and in five episodes narrated Tove Jansson's Finn Family Moomintroll.

Personal life

Zetterling was married to Norwegian actor Tutte Lemkow from 1944 to 1953. They had a daughter, Etienne and a son, Louis, who is professor of environmental sociology at the Autonomous University of Barcelona. In her autobiography All Those Tomorrows, published in 1985, Zetterling details love affairs with actor Herbert Lom and Tyrone Power, with whom she lived from 1956 until early 1958.

From 1958 to 1976, she was married to British author David Hughes, who collaborated with her on her first films as director. The couple were friends with the composer Michael Hurd, who wrote the music scores for Flickorna and Scrubbers.

Documents at the National Archives in London show that, as a member of the Hollywood Left, she was watched by British security agents as a suspected Communist. However, the UK never had a system along the lines of the American Hollywood Blacklist.

Death
On 17 March 1994, a year after her final role on television, Zetterling died from cancer at the age of 68 in her home in London.

Selected filmography
As director (complete)

As actor (selected)
 
 Lasse-Maja (1941)
 I Killed (1943)
 Prince Gustaf (1944)
 Torment (1944)
 Sunshine Follows Rain (1946)
 Iris and the Lieutenant (1946)
 Frieda (1947)
 Life Starts Now (1948)
 Music in Darkness (1948)
 Portrait from Life (1948)
 Quartet (1948)
 The Romantic Age (1949)
 The Bad Lord Byron (1949)
 The Lost People (1949)
 Blackmailed (1951)
 Hell Is Sold Out (1951)
 The Ringer (1952)
 The Tall Headlines (1952)
 Desperate Moment (1953)
 Knock on Wood (1954)
 Dance, Little Lady (1954)
 A Prize of Gold (1955)
 A Doll's House (1956)
 Abandon Ship (1957)
 The Truth About Women (1957)
 The Master Builder (1958)
 Playing on the Rainbow (1958)
 Jet Storm (1959)
 Faces in the Dark (1960)
 Piccadilly Third Stop (1960)
 Offbeat (1961)
 Only Two Can Play (1962)
 The Main Attraction (1962)
 Operation Mermaid (1963)
 The Man Who Finally Died (1963)
 The Vine Bridge (1965)
 Hidden Agenda (1990)
 The Witches (1990)
 Grandpa's Journey (1993)

Works

References

Further reading

External links

  Biographical Dictionary of Swedish Women
Mai Zetterling at Turner Classic Movies
Mai Zetterling at Encyclopedia.com
Mai Zetterling at Nordic Women In Film
Mai Zetterling at Britannica
Mai Zetterling Archives
Mai Zetterling at Nationalencyklopedins Internettjänst

1925 births
1994 deaths
People from Västerås
Swedish film actresses
Swedish film directors
Deaths from cancer in England
20th-century Swedish actresses
Swedish stage actresses
Swedish television actresses
Actresses from London
Swedish expatriates in England
Swedish women film directors
20th-century English women
20th-century English people